Nafri is a Papuan language of Papua, Indonesia. It is spoken in Nafri village on southeast Yotafa Bay in Abepura District, Jayapura Regency.

References

Languages of western New Guinea

Sentani languages